The Asokwa Interchange is an interchange under construction in Kumasi, Ghana.

References

Road interchanges in Ghana
Roads in Ghana